Diouloulou is a small town and commune in the Bignona Department of the Ziguinchor Region of southwestern Senegal. In 2002, the town had a population of 2,725 people. 

Diouloulou, a quiet, unremarkable town, lies along the N5 road. There is a small church, Eglise de Diouloulou, in the southern outskirts of the town, and a campement at Auberge Myriam.

History
In April 2002, an MFDC splinter group, the North Front, led by Kamouguc Diatta, carried out an attack on the town, a month after assaulting Kafountine.
On December 20, 2005, armed gunmen assassinated Cherif Samsidine Nema Aidara, a government ambassador to the Casamance peace process, at his home in the town.

References

Populated places in the Bignona Department
Communes of Senegal